The Wendish Quarter or Sorbian Quarter, is a historical ethnic enclave and district in Cottbus, Brandenburg, Germany.

History
Created from between 1984 and 1989 between Berliner Square and Oberkirche Square, its architecture is influenced by traditional Sorbian motifs and style.

See also
Sorbs
Cottbus
Lusatia

References 

Ethnic enclaves in Germany
Sorbian culture
Cottbus